Scrambled eggs is an egg dish.

Scrambled eggs may also refer to:

Scrambled egg (uniform) - nickname for military visor insignia
Scrambled Eggs (1939 film), a 1939 Walter Lantz cartoon
Scrambled Eggs (1976 film), a 1976 French film
Corydalis aurea, a plant commonly referred to as scrambled eggs
"Scrambled Eggs" (Garfield and Friends), episode of Garfield and Friends from 1989
"Scrambled Eggs" - the working title for the tune "Yesterday" by The Beatles
Scrambled Eggs, a board game variant of Lines of Action
Scrambled eggs, a game of Technōs Japan